The flag of Ladins is horizontal tricolour of blue, white, and green. Ladin people are an ethnic group in northern Italy.

Overview
The flag symbolizes the landscape: blue for the sky, white for the mountains and green for the meadows. The flag was introduced in 1920 during the Ladin Congress. It is unclear whether the flag was allowed during the time of Italian fascism. There are some which have also symbols or even coats of arms of Ladin families or municipalities, but these are only created by irrelevant people or organizations, no official institutions. The vertical version is less popular, but widespread especially outside of South Tyrol.

References

External links
 

Flags of Italy
Flags introduced in 1920
Ethnic flags